The Best Athlete with a Disability ESPY Award (sometimes called the Outstanding Athlete with a Disability ESPY Award) was an annual award honoring the achievements of an athlete from the world of disabled sports. It was first presented as part of the ESPY Awards at the 2002 edition as part of the ceremony's tenth anniversary of its establishment. The Best Athlete with a Disability ESPY Award trophy, designed by sculptor Lawrence Nowlan, was presented to the disabled sportsperson adjudged to be the best at the annual ESPY Awards ceremony in Los Angeles. For the 2004 ceremony, the winner was chosen by online voting through choices selected by the ESPN Select Nominating Committee. Before that, determination of the winners was made by an panel of experts. Through the 2001 iteration of the ESPY Awards, ceremonies were conducted in February of each year to honor achievements over the previous calendar year; awards presented thereafter are conferred in July and reflect performance from the June previous.

The inaugural winner of the Best Athlete with a Disability ESPY Award at the 2002 edition was mountain climber Erik Weihenmayer who suffers from a total visual impairment and he became the first blind person to reach the summit of Mount Everest in May 2001. He is one of three people to have won the award during its three-year history; sprinter Marlon Shirley won the accolade at the 2003 ceremony for becoming the first amputee in history to set a time below eleven seconds in the men's 100 metres at the Utah Summer Games, and Kyle Maynard was voted the winner of the award in the 2004 iteration because of his strong form in freestyle wrestling in high school despite being born with congenital amputation that resulted in the shortening of all his limbs. The Best Athlete with a Disability ESPY Award was discontinued and bifurcated by gender in 2005 to establish the Best Male Athlete with a Disability ESPY Award and the Best Female Athlete with a Disability ESPY Award.

Winners and nominees

See also
United States Olympic Committee Paralympian of the Year Award
Laureus World Sports Award for Sportsperson of the Year with a Disability

Notes and references

Notes

References

External links
 

ESPY Awards
Disabled sports awards
Awards established in 2002
Awards disestablished in 2004
2002 establishments in the United States